Heroes of the Flames is a 1931 American Universal movie serial. Although once considered to be lost, it has survived and a print has been preserved by Universal as of 2016. It stars Tim McCoy (in a break from his usual cowboy roles) as a firefighter who is developing a new kind of flame retardant, but his work is constantly being disrupted by a rival named Don Mitchell (Gayne Whitman) who wants the formula for himself as well as the leading lady, played by Marion Shockley. Fittingly, seven of the 11 cliffhangers involve burning buildings with at least one principal trapped inside.

It is unusual for the manner in which chapter recaps are handled: A reporter at a local newspaper repeats a summary of the previous episode as he takes it down from a witness on the phone. It also has no music at all—the opening titles are accompanied only by sound effects (sirens, bells ringing, fire crackling, etc.). It's also the only film in which future star Bruce Cabot appeared in an uncredited bit part.

Cast
Tim McCoy as Bob Darrow
Marion Shockley as June Madison
Bobby Nelson as Jackie Madison
Gayne Whitman as Don Mitchell
William Gould as John Madison
Grace Cunard as Mrs. Madison
Andy Devine as a henchman
Monte Montague as Bob's sidekick
Bud Osborne as a henchman
Edmund Cobb as a henchman
Joe Bonomo as a henchman
Walter Brennan -Bit Part – uncredited 	[Ch. 12]

Chapter titles
The Red Peril
Flaming Hate
The Fire Trap
Death's Chariot
The Avalanche
The Jaws of Death
Forest of Fire
Blank Cartridges
The House of Terror (aka The House of Horror)
The Depths of Doom
A Flaming Death
The Last Alarm

See also
 List of American films of 1931
 List of firefighting films

References

External links

1931 films
1931 adventure films
American black-and-white films
1930s English-language films
Films about firefighting
Universal Pictures film serials
Films directed by Robert F. Hill
1930s rediscovered films
American adventure films
Rediscovered American films
Films with screenplays by George H. Plympton
1930s American films